The Alabama Crimson Tide volleyball team represents the University of Alabama located in Tuscaloosa, Alabama, and competes in National Collegiate Athletics Association (NCAA) Division I, and the Southeastern Conference (SEC).

Program record and history 

The University of Alabama first fielded a women's volleyball team in the fall of 1974. Since then the Crimson Tide has been to the AIAW & NCAA Tournament 7 times, and won the SEC Western Division titles in 2000 & 2004. After being the head coach for 15 years Judy Green retired after the 2010 season. Alabama then hired Ed Allen to take over the program as they transitioned back into Foster Auditorium, their original home. Allen resigned in 2018, and was replaced by Lindsey Devine. 
<small>

See also
List of NCAA Division I women's volleyball programs

References

External links